The 1998 Pan American Race Walking Cup was held in Miami, Florida, United States.  The track of the Cup runs in the Biscayne Boulevard, Bayfront Park.

The women's 20 km race was held for the first time replacing the women's 10 km competition.

Complete results, medal winners until 2011, and the results for the Mexican athletes were published.

Medallists

Results

Men's 20 km

Team

Men's 50 km

Team

Women's 20 km

Team

Participation
The participation of 61 athletes from 9 countries is reported.

 (1)
 (6)
 (7)
 (4)
 (8)
 (7)
 México (14)
 (1)
 (13)

See also
 1998 Race Walking Year Ranking

References

Pan American Race Walking Cup
Pan American Race Walking Cup
Pan American Race Walking Cup
International track and field competitions hosted by the United States
Pan American Race Walking Cup
1990s in Miami
Sports competitions in Miami
Track and field in Florida
International sports competitions in Florida